Josh Kroenke (born May 7, 1980) is an American heir to the Walmart family inheritance and to Kroenke Sports & Entertainment, his father's sports-media conglomerate. He is involved in running the Denver Nuggets basketball franchise, the Colorado Avalanche ice hockey franchise, the Colorado Rapids,  and English football club Arsenal. The company co-owns Elitch Gardens Theme Park as well.

Early life
Josh Kroenke was born on May 7, 1980. His father is Stan Kroenke and his mother, Ann Walton Kroenke. Through his mother, he is a member of the Walton family, one of the richest families in the world, who founded Walmart and still own a controlling interest. He has a sister, Whitney Kroenke Burditt. He grew up in Columbia, Missouri, and attended Rock Bridge High School. He graduated from the University of Missouri, where he received a full basketball scholarship. While in college, Kroenke found himself involved in a scandal which led to the resignation of Larry Eustachy, the coach of the Iowa State basketball team. In 2003, Eustachy, a friend of Josh's father Stan Kroenke, attended a student party with Josh in Columbia, Missouri. Photos of Eustachy drinking with college students at the party later surfaced and led to his resignation from his position at Iowa State.

Career
He now serves as the President of both the National Basketball Association's Denver Nuggets and  National Hockey League's Colorado Avalanche.

In 2013, he was appointed by his father, the majority shareholder, to the board of English association football club Arsenal as a non-executive director. As directors of Arsenal, the Kroenkes have garnered significant antipathy from supporters, who feel that they have no ambition and are merely using the club for their own profit at the expense of the team's competitiveness.

In April 2021, Arsenal were announced as a founding member of the European Super League, which would have effectively ended the pyramid system of European football and placed Arsenal in a closed league without prospects for meritocratic relegation and promotion. Arsenal and the five other English clubs involved backed out within two days after a strong backlash. After the aborted attempt to end the European football system, Arsenal fans protested and called for the Kroenke family to sell the club. The Kroenke family released a statement saying they would not sell the club.

Personal life
Kroenke resides in Denver, Colorado. Kroenke purchased an 1,885-square foot condo for $1.4 million in 2007. Prior to his move to Denver, Kroenke lived in New York City. He and his sister, Whitney Kroenke Burditt, purchased a 1,735-square-foot condominium, with a 400-square-foot roof deck, a small balcony and views of the Empire State Building for $2.7 million in 2005. They sold it in 2007 for $2.45 million—below both the initial listed price of $2.995 million and their final asking price of $2.55 million.

References

1980 births
Living people
American real estate businesspeople
Arsenal F.C. directors and chairmen
Businesspeople from Columbia, Missouri
Colorado Avalanche executives
Denver Nuggets executives
Kroenke Sports & Entertainment
National Hockey League executives
People from Columbia, Missouri
Rock Bridge High School alumni
University of Missouri alumni
Walton family
Los Angeles Gladiators